A hot plate is a portable self-contained tabletop small appliance cooktop that features one or more electric heating elements or gas burners. A hot plate can be used as a stand-alone appliance, but is often used as a substitute for one of the burners from an oven range or a kitchen stove. Hot plates are often used for food preparation, generally in locations where a full kitchen stove would not be convenient or practical. They can also be used as a heat source in laboratories.  A hot plate can have a flat surface or round surface. Hot plates can be used for traveling or in areas without electricity.

Description
This type of cooking equipment is typically powered by electricity; however, gas fired hot plates were not uncommon in the 19th and 20th century and are still available in various markets around the world.

In scientific research

In laboratory settings, hot plates are generally used to heat glassware or its contents. Some hot plates also contain an integrated magnetic stirrer, allowing the heated liquid to be stirred automatically.

In a student laboratory, hot plates are used because baths can be hazards if they spill, overheat or ignite because they have high thermal inertia (meaning they take a long time to cool down) and mantles can be very expensive and are designed for specific flask volumes.

Two alternative methods for heating glassware using a hotplate are available. One method is to suspend glassware slightly above the surface of the plate with no direct contact. This not only reduces the temperature of the glass, but it slows down the rate of heat exchange and encourages even heating. This works well for low boiling point operations or when a heat source's minimum temperature is high. Another method, called a teepee setup because it looks a little like a tipi, is to suspend glassware above a plate and surround the flask by a skirt of tinfoil. The skirt should start at the neck of the flask and drape down to the surface of the plate, not touching the sides of the flask, but covering the majority of the plates surface. This method is for glassware to be heated at higher temperatures because the flask is warmed indirectly by the hot air collecting under the skirt and unlike simply suspending the glassware, this method is better protected from drafts. Both these methods are useful in a student laboratory as they are cheaper, effective, safe, and the user does not have to wait for a bath to cool down after use.

Industrial hot plates

Hot plates are widely used for many industrial applications. These hot plates vary in size from 2 to over 300 square centimetres.

Typical operating temperatures vary from 100 to 750 °C and power requirements are usually in the 120 to 480 volt range. Most industrial hot plates will withstand loads more than 150 pounds.

Industrial hot plates which incorporate a porous heated plate are referred to as heated chucks. These plates are used to heat thin sheets evenly by drawing the sheets firmly on the plate with a vacuum. These plates are widely used in the process of manufacturing semiconductors.

Hot plates using special material and protective coatings are used in mining and related industries to heat samples of toxic chemicals. Such hot plates are usually referred to as corrosion-resistant hot plates.

Hot plates are widely used in the electronics industry as a method of soldering and desoldering components onto circuit boards.

Hot plates with two heating surfaces are used to fuse plastic pipes. Many of these pipes are over 90-centimeter diameter. The two pipes to be fused are pressed against the plate till the edges are soft. The plate is removed and the two pipes are pressed together and bonded. This process is called butt fusion.

See also 
 Bachelor griller
 Blech, a sheet of metal that may be placed over cooking burners to help in the observation of the Jewish Sabbath
 Griddle, a flat heated cooking surface, maybe a pan, a gas powered version or in table-top electrical appliance form
 Heating element, a material that converts electrical energy to heat through resistance
 List of stoves
 Portable stove, a portable cooking device that may burn liquid or gas fuel

References

External links

Laboratory equipment
Cooking appliances